EdisonFuture is an American startup company that plans to produce electric pickup trucks and vans.  It was established in 2020 and is based in Livermore, California. It belongs to the Chinese company SPI Energy.

History

In 2020, the Chinese company SPI Energy, which already owned a full stake in the local company Phoenix Motorcars, decided to expand its presence in the United States by creating the EdisonFuture startup. In January 2021, the company started cooperation with the Icona Design styling office, which was commissioned to develop the appearance of the first planned EdisonFuture vehicles.

Models 
In mid-October 2021, EdisonFuture presented detailed visuals of its first vehicle, the EF1. Available both as a full-size 4-door pickup truck and a built-in pickup truck, it is expected to go on sale in the first half of 2022. 

The EF1-T in pickup model and EFT1V is their van model. EF1-T standard model with a single rear motor is rated to tow 7,500 pounds. The EF1-TP premium two-motor variant can tow 9,000 pounds. The top EF1-TS Super tri-motor range topper can tow 11,000 pounds. The EF1-V van, rear-drive model can tow 7,500 pounds and two-motor AWD long-range model can tow 8,000 pounds.

References

External links 

American companies established in 2020
Electric vehicle manufacturers of the United States
Motor vehicle manufacturers based in California
Vehicle manufacturing companies established in 2020
Battery electric vehicle manufacturers